We're Going to Be Rich is a 1938 British historical musical comedy film directed by Monty Banks and starring Gracie Fields, Victor McLaglen and Brian Donlevy.

Plot
During the 1880s Kit Dobson, an English music hall singer performing in Australia, has scraped together enough money to buy a passage home to Britain with plans to settle down. However, unknown to her, her unreliable boyfriend has used most of the money to buy a gold mine in South Africa. They arrive in Gold Rush Johannesburg only to find that they have been swindled. The only option left for them is for Kit to seek a job singing in a saloon run by an American known as Yankee Gordon.

Cast
 Gracie Fields as Kit Dobson
 Victor McLaglen as Dobbie
 Brian Donlevy as Yankee Gordon
 Coral Browne as Pearl
 Ted Smith as Tim
 Gus McNaughton as Broderick
 Charles Carson as Keeler
 Syd Crossley as Jake
 Hal Gordon as Charlie
 Robert Nainby as Judge
 Charles Harrison as Rat Face
 Tom Payne as Kinch
 Don McCorkindale as Killer
 Joe Mott as Manager
 Alex Davies as Kimberley Kid

Production
The film was the first made following Fields switch from Ealing Studios to 20th Century Fox. It was shot at Denham Studios. It was made with a budget of $500,000.

References

Bibliography
 Low, Rachael. Filmmaking in 1930s Britain. George Allen & Unwin, 1985.
 Wood, Linda. British Films, 1927-1939. British Film Institute, 1986.

External links

1938 films
1938 musical comedy films
1930s English-language films
Films directed by Monty Banks
British musical comedy films
20th Century Fox films
Films set in the 1880s
Films set in Australia
Films set in South Africa
British historical comedy films
1930s historical musical films
Films shot at Denham Film Studios
British black-and-white films
British historical musical films
1930s British films